Udell is a city in Appanoose County, Iowa, United States. The population was 28 at the time of the 2020 census.

History
Udell was founded in 1895. It was named for Dr. Nathan Udell, a pioneer settler.

Geography
Udell is located at  (40.780199, -92.741393).

Demographics

2010 census
As of the census of 2010, there were 47 people, 21 households, and 13 families living in the city. The racial makeup of the city was 95.7% White, 2.1% from other races, and 2.1% from two or more races. Hispanic or Latino of any race were 2.1% of the population.

There were 21 households, of which 19.0% had children under the age of 18 living with them, 52.4% were married couples living together, 9.5% had a male householder with no wife present, and 38.1% were non-families. 28.6% of all households were made up of individuals, and 9.5% had someone living alone who was 65 years of age or older. The average household size was 2.24 and the average family size was 2.46.

The median age in the city was 41.5 years. 21.3% of residents were under the age of 18; 6.4% were between the ages of 18 and 24; 23.4% were from 25 to 44; 17% were from 45 to 64; and 31.9% were 65 years of age or older. The gender makeup of the city was 57.4% male and 42.6% female.

2000 census
As of the census of 2000, there were 58 people, 21 households, and 17 families living in the city. The racial makeup of the city was 91.38% White, 3.45% Asian, 5.17% from other races. Hispanic or Latino of any race were 3.45% of the population.

There were 21 households, out of which 33.3% had children under the age of 18 living with them, 61.9% were married couples living together, 19.0% had a female householder with no husband present, and 19.0% were non-families. 19.0% of all households were made up of individuals, and 4.8% had someone living alone who was 65 years of age or older. The average household size was 2.76 and the average family size was 3.18.

In the city, the population was spread out, with 34.5% under the age of 18, 3.4% from 18 to 24, 25.9% from 25 to 44, 24.1% from 45 to 64, and 12.1% who were 65 years of age or older. The median age was 35 years. For every 100 females, there were 114.8 males. For every 100 females age 18 and over, there were 111.1 males.

The median income for a household in the city was $24,688, and the median income for a family was $28,750. Males had a median income of $33,750 versus $20,000 for females. The per capita income for the city was $7,294. There were 16.7% of families and 15.3% of the population living below the poverty line, including 16.7% of under eighteens and none of those over 64.

References

Cities in Appanoose County, Iowa
Cities in Iowa
1895 establishments in Iowa